The John Howland Award is the highest honor bestowed by the American Pediatric Society (APS). Named in honor of John Howland (1873–1926), the award, with its accompanying medal, is presented annually by the American Pediatric Society for "distinguished service to pediatrics as a whole." Since 1952, when Edwards A. Park, M.D., received the inaugural Howland Award, this honor has been bestowed upon esteemed leaders in academic pediatrics whose significant contributions have advanced the lives of children and the profession of pediatrics through clinical care, scientific discovery, mentorship and service.

Article II of the APS Constitution forms the actual basis for the selection of the Howland recipient, which states:

Award recipients
Source: APS

See also

 List of medicine awards

References

Awards established in 1952
Medicine awards
American science and technology awards